Wood Lawn may refer to:
 Wood Lawn (Mount Mourne, North Carolina), listed on the NRHP in Iredell County
 Wood Lawn (New Brunswick, New Jersey), listed on the NRHP in Middlesex County

See also
 Woodlawn (disambiguation)
 Woodlawn Cemetery (disambiguation)